Abarema commutata is a species of plant in the family Fabaceae. It is found in Guyana, Venezuela, Suriname and Bolivia. It is confined to a small number of localities in montane savanna-forests, including the Gran Sabana, the Pacaraima Mountains, the Kanuku Mountains and Tafelberg.

References

commutata
Flora of Guyana
Flora of Venezuela
Flora of Suriname
Flora of Bolivia
Least concern plants
Taxonomy articles created by Polbot